Kristen Carroll Wiig (born August 22, 1973) is an American actress, comedian, screenwriter, producer, and singer. First breaking through as a performer with the Los Angeles comedy troupe The Groundlings, Wiig achieved nationwide stardom during her seven-season tenure as a cast member on the NBC sketch comedy series Saturday Night Live from 2005 to 2012.

Born in Canandaigua, New York, she was raised in Lancaster, Pennsylvania, and later in Rochester, New York. She moved to Los Angeles, where she joined the improvisational comedy troupe The Groundlings and made her television debut as Dr. Pat on The Joe Schmo Show (2003).

Wiig joined the cast of Saturday Night Live in 2005 and appeared in the Christmas comedy film Unaccompanied Minors the next year. After a series of supporting roles in comedy films such as Knocked Up (2007), Adventureland (2009), Whip It (2009) and Paul (2011), she co-wrote and starred in the comedy film Bridesmaids (2011), which was critically and commercially successful. It earned her a Golden Globe Award nomination for Best Actress – Musical or Comedy, nominations for the BAFTA and Academy Award for Best Original Screenplay, and a Screen Actors Guild Award nomination for Outstanding Performance by a Cast.

Wiig lent her voice to the animated franchises How to Train Your Dragon (2010–2019) and Despicable Me (2010–2024). She was nominated for a Primetime Emmy Award for Outstanding Lead Actress in a Miniseries or a Movie for her role as Cynthia Morehouse in the comedy miniseries The Spoils of Babylon (2014). Her other film credits include Girl Most Likely (2012), The Secret Life of Walter Mitty (2013), The Skeleton Twins (2014), Welcome to Me (2014), The Diary of a Teenage Girl (2015), The Martian (2015), Ghostbusters (2016), Downsizing (2017), Mother! (2017), Where'd You Go, Bernadette (2019), and Wonder Woman 1984 (2020).

Early life
Wiig was born on August 22, 1973, in Canandaigua, New York, the daughter of Jon Wiig, who ran a lake marina in Western New York, and Laurie (née Johnston), an artist. She has an older brother Erik. Her father has Norwegian and Irish ancestry, and her mother, English and Scottish. The name Wiig comes from the area of Vik in Sogn og Fjordane in Norway. Kristen's paternal grandfather, Gunnar Wiig, emigrated from Norway to the United States as a child and grew up in Rochester, New York, where he was an accomplished broadcaster for the Rochester Red Wings baseball team, and later became an executive at WHEC radio, WHEC-TV, and WROC-TV.

Wiig moved with her family to Lancaster, Pennsylvania at the age of three, and attended Nitrauer Elementary School and Manheim Township Middle School until eighth grade. When she was 13, she and her family returned to Rochester where she attended Allendale Columbia School for ninth and tenth grades and graduated from Brighton High School.

Wiig attended Roanoke College, but soon returned to Rochester. She attended community college and embarked on a three-month outdoor-living program. She had no performing ambitions at the time. Wiig then attended the University of Arizona, majoring in art. When she took an acting class to fulfill a course requirement, the teacher suggested she continue to act. She was hired by a plastic surgery clinic to draw postsurgery bodies, but the day before the job began, she decided to move to Los Angeles to pursue an acting career.

Career

SNL and early film roles (2000–2010)
Wiig relocated to Los Angeles to act while working odd jobs to support herself. She performed with Empty Stage Comedy Theatre and The Groundlings. She felt improvisation was a better fit than acting, and being a part of the comedy group improved her skills. In 2003, she appeared in Spike TV's The Joe Schmo Show, a spoof of reality television, in which she portrayed Dr. Pat, a quack marriage counselor. She auditioned for Mad TV. While at The Groundlings, Wiig's manager encouraged her to submit an audition tape to Saturday Night Live. She played the Target Lady on part of her audition tape. She debuted on SNL shortly into season 31, on November 12, 2005. She survived an SNL budget cut and became a full cast member at the beginning of season 32 in 2006.

She was nominated for four Primetime Emmy Awards for Outstanding Supporting Actress in a Comedy Series for her work on SNL (2009 to 2012). Wiig headlined the 2009 Christmas special SNL Presents: A Very Gilly Christmas, featuring new sketches with her character Gilly and highlights of older SNL clips. She was featured in Entertainment Weekly's list of 15 Great Performances for her various impersonations on SNL (December 2008) and in EW's list of the 25 Funniest Women in Hollywood (April 2009). She voiced Lola Bunny in the series The Looney Tunes Show from 2011 to 2014.

Wiig made her film debut in the 2006 Christmas movie Unaccompanied Minors, and appeared in Judd Apatow's 2007 comedy Knocked Up as a passive-aggressive assistant. She also performed in Jake Kasdan's Walk Hard, another Apatow-produced film. Between 2008 and 2010, she had supporting roles in several studio comedies which had various degrees of success. She made a cameo appearance as Bear Trainer Girl in the 2008 comedy Semi-Pro, reuniting with SNL alum Will Ferrell. She played a yoga instructor in Forgetting Sarah Marshall and a self-involved surgeon in David Koepp's Ghost Town.

Wiig co-starred in Greg Mottola's 2009 coming-of-age dramedy Adventureland, voiced a beaver mom in the animated adventure film Ice Age: Dawn of the Dinosaurs, played a roller derby competitor in Whip It (Drew Barrymore's directorial debut) and appeared as the wife of a flavoring-extracts company owner in Mike Judge's Extract. She had a brief role in Andrew Jarecki's 2010 drama All Good Things, starred opposite Will Forte and Ryan Phillippe in MacGruber, and voiced two big-budget animated films, Despicable Me and How to Train Your Dragon, that kicked off two highly profitable film franchises.

Breakthrough (2011–2016)
2011 was a turning point in Wiig's career. The comedy Bridesmaids, which she wrote with fellow Groundlings performer Annie Mumolo, was released that spring by Universal Pictures to critical acclaim, making US$167 million in North America and US$280 million worldwide. In her top-billed role, she played a single woman suffering a series of misfortunes after being asked to be her best friend's maid of honor. The New York Times wrote: "A lanky-limbed blonde who evokes Meg Ryan stretched along Olive Oyl lines, Ms. Wiig keeps her features jumping and sometimes bunching. She's a funny, pretty woman, but she's also a comedian, and she's wonderfully confident about playing not nice [...] Ms. Wiig, a longtime cast member of Saturday Night Live, and Ms. Mumolo, a veteran of the Los Angeles comedy troupe the Groundlings, know what female moviegoers want: honest laughs with, and not solely about, women". For her work in the film, Wiig was nominated for the Golden Globe Award for Best Actress – Motion Picture Comedy or Musical and the Academy Award for Best Original Screenplay. Her last 2011 film was the romantic comedy Friends with Kids, where she played one half of a sex-obsessed couple, opposite Bridemaids collaborator Maya Rudolph. It received positive reviews, who deemed it "sharp, shrewd, and funny", and was a success in limited release.

In the 2010s, Wiig was a prominent figure in Hollywood, acting in leading and supporting roles. The little-seen dramedy Revenge for Jolly!, which premiered at the Tribeca Film Festival, was her first 2012 release. In the comedy Girl Most Likely, she headlined opposite Annette Bening as a playwright who stages a suicide in an attempt to win back her ex, only to wind up in the custody of her gambling-addict mother. Rotten Tomatoes gave it a 20% rating based on 85 reviews, with the site's consensus: "Largely witless and disappointingly dull, Girl Most Likely strands the gifted Kristen Wiig in a blandly hollow foray into scattershot sitcom territory."

Her final performance as a cast member on Saturday Night Live was season 37, episode 22, which aired on May 19, 2012 and was hosted by Mick Jagger. The closing celebration of her time on the show included SNL alumni Amy Poehler, Chris Kattan, Chris Parnell, Will Forte, and Rachel Dratch, as well as Steve Martin and Jon Hamm. She has since returned to host the program several times.

Wiig again provided her voice for Despicable Me 2, released in June 2013, and for the character of Sexy Kitten in the critically acclaimed sci-fi romantic drama Her (2013). She portrayed the love interest and co-worker of the titular character in the adventure dramedy The Secret Life of Walter Mitty (also 2013), alongside Ben Stiller and Sean Penn; it polarized critics and was a moderate success. The New York Daily News praised Stiller and Wiig's "sweet, mellow chemistry", and Peter Travers of Rolling Stone found her to be "lovely, low-key" in the film, which he considered as "uniquely funny and unexpectedly tender". Her other 2013 film was the comedy sequel Anchorman 2: The Legend Continues, in which she teamed with frequent collaborators Will Ferrell and Steve Carell. With Ferrell, she subsequently starred in the six-episode miniseries The Spoils of Babylon (2014), and its fellow-up The Spoils Before Dying (2015) as well as the made-for-television film A Deadly Adoption (2015). While Joshua Alston of The A.V. Club gave A Deadly Adoption a B− and commented that everything in the film is "right visually, and Ferrell and Wiig are close enough to where they should be tonally", Wiig was nominated for a Primetime Emmy Award for Outstanding Lead Actress in a Miniseries or a Movie for her role in The Spoils of Babylon.

Hateship, Loveship (2014), her next theatrically released production, was based on the 2001 short story "Hateship, Friendship, Courtship, Loveship, Marriage" by Alice Munro. In it, she played a woman who must move to a new town to begin work as a housekeeper for an elderly man who needs help keeping house. Critics asserted that Wiig's "vibrant performance is almost worth the price of admission—and it has to be, because Hateship Loveship doesn't have much else going for it", as part of a mixed overall response. In 2014, she also reprised her role in How to Train Your Dragon 2, and starred with Bill Hader in Craig Johnson's dramedy The Skeleton Twins, as estranged twins reuniting with the possibility of mending their relationship. The Skeleton Twins was an arthouse success, with the Globe and Mail remarking: "Johnson's unfussy direction serves as a fine showcase for the two SNL veterans to demonstrate how their comic shorthand plays equally well in a slightly darker register".

For singer-songwriter Sia's performance of her 2014 single "Chandelier" at the 2015 Grammy Awards, Wiig danced alongside child dancer Maddie Ziegler. The dramedy Welcome to Me was released in selected theaters in May 2015, to a positive critical response; in it, Wiig played a multi-millionaire with borderline personality disorder who uses her newfound wealth to write and star in an autobiographical talk show. Rotten Tomatoes' consensus was: "A transfixing central performance by Kristen Wiig holds Welcome to Me together and compensates for its uneven stretches." In her next film, another dramedy titled The Diary of a Teenage Girl, Wiig starred as a woman whose boyfriend starts a sexual relationship with her daughter. Like Welcome to Me, the film received a limited theatrical release and was favorably received by critics. In 2015, she also played the director of media relations for NASA in the successful sci-fi drama The Martian, opposite Matt Damon, and starred as a family practitioner who is more interested in having a baby than having a boyfriend in the black comedy Nasty Baby, directed by Chilean filmmaker Sebastián Silva.

In the comedy Zoolander 2 (2016), Wiig took on the role of a villain and the "Queen of Haute Couture", alongside Ben Stiller, Owen Wilson and Will Ferrell. For the outrageous look of her character, she revealed that she spent around eight hours applying and removing her look each day. Zoolander 2 was a critical and commercial flop. The much criticized all-female reboot Ghostbusters (also 2016) featured Wiig as an author who bands with other paranormal enthusiasts to stop an otherworldly threat. and budgeted at over US$140 million, it made US$229 million. In 2016, she also voiced a hot dog bun in the animated comedy Sausage Party, and played a woman planning a robbery in Masterminds.

Later roles (2017–present)
In 2017, Wiig provided her voice for Despicable Me 3 and appeared in the film Downsizing, reuniting with Damon. She was scheduled to star in and executive produce, with Reese Witherspoon and Lauren Neustadter, a new untitled 30-minute comedy series from Apple and Witherspoon's company Hello Sunshine, but later withdrew from the project. She next played the villain Cheetah in Wonder Woman 1984, released in 2020, and co-wrote and starred in the well-reviewed 2021 comedy Barb and Star Go to Vista Del Mar, appearing and co-writing with Annie Mumolo, for Lionsgate., and also played Aunt Carlotta in Netflix film A Boy Called Christmas.

Personal life
Wiig was married to actor Hayes Hargrove from 2005 to 2009, and dated The Strokes drummer Fabrizio Moretti from 2011 to 2013. In early 2019, after three years of dating, she became engaged to actor Avi Rothman. In January 2020, she and Rothman became the parents of twins, a boy, Shiloh, and a girl, Luna, via surrogacy. The twins' names were revealed in the credits of Barb and Star Go to Vista Del Mar. In February 2021, Wiig confirmed that she and Rothman had married. They live in Pasadena, California. Wiig is a vegetarian.

Filmography

Film

Television

Music videos

Producer

Discography

Songwriting credits

Awards and nominations

 She was named one of PETA's Sexiest Vegetarian Celebrities of 2011.
 She is part of Times 2012 list of The 100 Most Influential People in the World.

References

External links

 
 
 
 
 
 
 

1973 births
Living people
21st-century American actresses
Actresses from Pennsylvania
American film actresses
Film producers from New York (state)
American impressionists (entertainers)
American people of English descent
American people of Irish descent
American people of Norwegian descent
American people of Scottish descent
American women film producers
American television actresses
American voice actresses
American women comedians
Audiobook narrators
People from Canandaigua, New York
Actors from Lancaster, Pennsylvania
Actresses from Rochester, New York
University of Arizona alumni
American women screenwriters
American sketch comedians
Comedians from New York (state)
Screenwriters from New York (state)
Screenwriters from Pennsylvania
Screenwriters from Arizona
Film producers from Pennsylvania
Film producers from Arizona
21st-century American comedians
21st-century American screenwriters